The Nauvoo Legion was a state-authorized militia of the city of Nauvoo, Illinois, United States. With growing antagonism from surrounding settlements it came to have as its main function the defense of Nauvoo, and surrounding Latter Day Saint areas of settlement.

The Illinois state legislature granted Nauvoo a liberal city charter that gave the Nauvoo Legion extraordinary independence even though it was still a component of the Illinois State Militia and under the ultimate authority of the Governor of Illinois. Led by Joseph Smith, founder of the Latter Day Saint movement and a mayor of Nauvoo, the Legion quickly became a formidable concentration of military power.

Previously, from May to June 1834 Joseph Smith led an expedition of Latter Day Saints, known as Zion's Camp from Kirtland, Ohio, to Clay County, Missouri, in an attempt to regain land from which the Saints had been expelled by non-Mormon settlers. He organized the first Mormon militia group known as the "Armies of Israel" to protect his people.

In 1844, after a controversy where the Nauvoo Expositor newspaper was burned to the ground on Joseph Smith's orders, due to the publication of articles publicly exposing Smith's covert practice of polygamy; Joseph Smith was ordered to the Carthage Jail under charges of Treason. It was there Smith was killed by a mob. Soon thereafter, the Nauvoo charter was revoked, and the Nauvoo Legion lost its official sanction as an arm of the Illinois militia.

After the revocation of the Nauvoo Charter, the members of the Nauvoo Legion continued to operate under the command of Brigham Young, leader of the movement's largest faction, The Church of Jesus Christ of Latter-day Saints (LDS Church). Young led the Latter-day Saints to what later became the Territory of Utah. In Utah, the Deseret Militia and Utah Territorial Militia used the official name of the Nauvoo Legion. The Nauvoo Legion was permanently disbanded in 1887. In 1894, the former Utah Territorial Militia was reactivated and officially designated the Utah National Guard.

Formation in Nauvoo
In 1839, Joseph Smith relocated his followers from a hostile environment in Missouri to Commerce, Illinois, which he renamed Nauvoo. Voter-conscious Illinois Democrats and Whigs (including Abraham Lincoln) passed a bipartisan city-state charter for Nauvoo in 1840. On December 16 the governor signed it into law, granting Smith and the city of Nauvoo broad powers. Among these was the authority to create a "body of independent militarymen". This military force was a militia similar to the Illinois State Militia, and it became known as the "Nauvoo Legion". At its peak, the militia had, by conservative estimates, at least 2,500 troops, in comparison to the approximately 8,500 troops within the entire United States Army as of 1845. The Legion was organized into two regiments (called cohorts) of infantry and one regiment of cavalry. A few light cannons were also attached.

The Legion tended to be very top-heavy, in that there was a disproportionate number of high-ranking officers to regular soldiers. Supposedly, this was to elevate the social status and official standing of some members of the city.

Authority over Legion
Although the charter authorizing the Nauvoo Legion created an independent militia, it could be used at the disposal of the state governor or the President of the United States as well as for the mayor of Nauvoo. Joseph Smith himself was Nauvoo's second mayor, and the Nauvoo court martial also appointed him as highest-ranking officer of the Legion, a Lieutenant General. This rank is one step above Major General, which most contemporary militias employed as their commanding rank. One motive for the higher rank was to prevent Smith from being tried in a court-martial by officers of lesser rank. In 1838 the Missouri militia had contemplated a court-martial against Smith, an action that might have been illegal had it been carried out, as Smith was only a civilian at that time.

Nauvoo under Mormon martial law
In the last month of his life, June 1844, Joseph Smith declared martial law in Nauvoo in response to various civil disturbances and initially deployed the Nauvoo Legion to defend the city, only to restrain the Legion from any action later. He urged Legion members to not take any action when the Illinois governor ordered the arrests of the Smith brothers, for violating state statutes and by not receiving
authorized permission to impose martial law from the Governor of Illinois.

Death of Smith brothers
Joseph Smith and his brother Hyrum surrendered at the Carthage, Illinois, jail, with the promise of protection from Governor Thomas Ford and the Carthage Greys, the local state militia in Hancock County. However, on June 27, 1844, the Carthage Greys were vastly outnumbered by the mob surrounding the jail, and did not intervene in the ensuing assassination.

Legion survival after death of Joseph Smith
The Nauvoo Legion survived the loss of its commanding officer, Joseph Smith, when Brigham Young automatically assumed command as the new church president in August 1844, though he had never previously been active in Legion activities because Young was in England on a proselytizing mission for several years and only returned home to Nauvoo when hearing of the prophet's death to assist the family, church, and citizens of Nauvoo . Rather than employ the Legion to protect Nauvoo from increased mob violence, Young directed Nauvoo's tens of thousands of citizens to migrate peacefully to the western part of the continent which wasn't yet part of the United States and they founded the territory of Utah. Nauvoo was officially abandoned and the last remaining citizens had vacated Nauvoo by September 17, 1846, under gunfire and cannon artillery barrage as Illinois and Missouri militia and mobs raided and burned Nauvoo to the ground .

Upon the revocation of the Nauvoo Charter in the winter of 1844–1845, the Nauvoo Legion was no longer recognized as state militia, and its members returned the majority of its government-issued arms. Depleted of its official status, remnants assumed roles such as guardians of the handcart and wagon companies heading west after being reorganized by Hosea Stout on September 22, 1846, as they amassed on the other side of the Mississippi River in the territory of Iowa where the citizens of Nauvoo were safe from attack by mobs and Illinois and Missouri militia, and waited for winter to end so they could migrate . An area memorialized by the somber Far West cemetery and LDS Temple.

There are however some reported incidents in diaries of Saints concerning gunfire exchange between legion members and mobs during the Nauvoo era . And also legion members participated in the rescue of Joseph from the state Militia who had unlawfully arrested him after luring him to what was supposed to be a peaceful political debate and were going to hang him .

Legion reformation in Utah

Mormon Battalion in Mexican–American War
Not long after the arrival of the Mormons in Iowa, in 1846, Mormon legionnaires volunteered to serve in the 500 man Mormon Battalion for the U.S. government military expedition to Mexican California during the Mexican–American War.

State of Deseret Territorial Militia
In 1847, Mormon leader Brigham Young reformed the Nauvoo Legion into a fully functional paramilitary force, which was organized into sub-units for each of the Utah counties as the Deseret Territorial Militia akin to their contemporaries the Army of the Republic of Texas and the Texas Rangers.

Walker Indian War
In the 1849 conflicts with Native Americans in Utah County, such as the attack at Battle Creek, Utah, and Battle at Fort Utah, foreshadowed the 1853–1854 Walker War between the Nauvoo Legion and Indians led by Chief Walkara ("Walker"). Twenty Mormon militiamen and many Native Americans died in the Walker War.

Utah War
The Nauvoo Legion was called up again in the Utah War against Federal troops entering Utah in the "Utah Expedition" from 1857 to 1858.  They employed tactics of supply destruction and avoided direct fighting.  Local commanders and members of the Iron County, Utah Territorial Militia, overcome with suspicion and war hysteria, perpetrated the Mountain Meadows Massacre against a group of wagon trains travelling from Arkansas to California in September. At this point Daniel H. Wells was the chief military commander of the militia.  It was also under the auspices of the militia that the groups of men were organized who were instructed to burn down Salt Lake City and other parts of northern Utah should the invading army try to take up residence.

After this conflict, the Federal government appointed Utah's territorial governor, and the Nauvoo Legion was allowed to exist at the command of the governor.  It, however, was not as cooperative in imposing the colonial regime as federal authorities would have liked.

American Civil War

During the American Civil War, federal troops either were withdrawn from Utah, or in many cases left to join the rebellion, Johnston who had led the invading federal army being among the latter group. The Federal government made a reconciliatory approach to Brigham Young, requesting his help. With his permission, two units of the reorganized Nauvoo Legion were gainfully employed by the United States to protect western mail and telegraph lines from Indian attacks in what is today Utah and Wyoming, but saw no meaningful action. Neither the Legion nor any other Mormon troops participated in the main theaters of the war, and the Legion's involvement ended in 1862 after Congress had passed the Morrill Anti-Bigamy Act.

Utah Black Hawk War
The final use of the Legion was in Utah's Black Hawk War 1865–1872 when over 2,500 troops were dispatched against Indians led by Antonga Black Hawk. (Antonga Black Hawk was a Ute and has no connection to the Illinois Sauk chief Black Hawk of the 1830s.) In 1870 the Utah Territorial governor, J. Wilson Shaffer forced the Legion inactive unless he ordered otherwise. Federal troops dispatched in response to the 1870 Ghost Dance ensured Shaffer's order was enforced.

Transition to Utah National Guard
The Nauvoo Legion never gathered again, and the 1887 Edmunds-Tucker Act permanently disbanded it. In 1894, in anticipation of statehood, the non-sectarian Utah National Guard was organized as Utah's official state militia.

Uniforms, weapons, and equipment

The Nauvoo Legion in Illinois was able to draw on Federal stands of arms. The most common musket issued to these militiamen was the Model 1816 Musket. This flintlock musket was an American built copy of the French 1777 Musket Model. Also, the Harper's Ferry Model 1803 Rifle was issued in smaller quantities. Personal arms were also used. A small artillery piece, an 1841 12-pound mountain howitzer was issued to the territorial militia.  It arrived in Salt Lake in 1852.  A carronade, a ship cannon, was purchased by the legion in Nauvoo.  It was carried to Salt Lake by the early party that occasionally used it as a speakers podium.  It was nicknamed the "Old Sow" and is on display at the Church History Museum in Salt Lake City. When the Mormon Battalion was enlisted in July, 1846, about 450 Model 1816 muskets were issued to the infantry.  Five 1803 Harpers Ferry rifles were issued to the hunters of company A.  Records for the weapons issued to the other companies are missing.  After the men were released from service in 1847, they headed for home, many stopping for temporary employment at Sutter's Fort.  6 of their group built the mill at Coloma, where gold was discovered.  Many of them took time to pan for gold and they were quite successful.  When they resumed their journey home, they bought two cannons from Sutter, a four pounder and a six pounder.  These were thought at that time to have come from Sutter's purchase of the Russian Fort Ross and to have been either Russian or French cannons.  This caused them to be lost after the deaths of the battalion members, because the source of the cannons was not written.  Sutter wrote a letter to the pioneer society in the 1870s where he said that his cannons, except for one Russian 4 pounder, which he donated to a museum in San Francisco, were all Spanish guns.  In 2001 three Spanish guns were identified in the LDS Church storage facility in Salt Lake City.  The bronze 4 pounder was found to have the crest of King Carlos 3 of Spain.  A 6-pound iron cannon, probably the other battalion cannon and a smaller, but similar, 2 pound cannon were in the warehouse. The provenance of the 2 pounder is currently unknown.  All three Spanish cannons, which were brought to Salt Lake City on pallets, were mounted on carriages copied from the mountain howitzer carriage, probably in preparation for the Mormon defense against Johnston's army in 1857.  Today the mountain howitzer is on display in the Fort Douglas museum in Salt Lake City.  The 4 pound Spanish bronze is in the Mormon Battalion Visitor Center in San Diego, Calif.  The is a copy of it in front of the center.  The iron Spanish 2 and 6 pound cannons remain in storage in Salt Lake City.

See also

 Nauvoo Brass Band
 Utah Army National Guard
 Green Mountain Boys
 Army of the Republic of Texas
 Texian Army
 Texas Navy
 California Republic (Bear Flaggers)

Notes

References
 .
 .
 .
 .
 .
 
 
 
 
 

 
1870 disestablishments
Church of Christ (Latter Day Saints)
History of the Church of Jesus Christ of Latter-day Saints
History of the Latter Day Saint movement
Latter Day Saint movement in Illinois
Military units and formations established in 1840
Pre-statehood history of Utah
The Church of Jesus Christ of Latter-day Saints in Utah
Utah in the American Civil War
Utah War
1840 establishments in Illinois
Armies by country